Alan Smith (born 3 September 1949) is a Welsh former professional footballer. A midfielder, he progressed through the youth team at Newport County and made his debut in 1966. He went on to make 100 English Football League appearances for Newport scoring 6 goals. In 1972, he joined Merthyr Tydfil.

References

External links

Welsh footballers
Newport County A.F.C. players
Merthyr Tydfil F.C. players
English Football League players
Living people
1949 births
Footballers from Newport, Wales
Association football midfielders